Roger Barton (born July 1, 1965, in Los Angeles) is an American film editor. He has worked on dozens of Hollywood films, including Titanic, Armageddon, Pirates of the Caribbean: Dead Men Tell No Tales, and Star Wars: Episode III – Revenge of the Sith.

He is best known for editing large budget action films, such as those in the Transformers film series directed by Michael Bay. Barton cites James Cameron’s original 1984 The Terminator movie as "one of the reasons I got into film—it had that big of an impact on me.” He eventually worked as assistant editor for two of the editors of Terminator series,  Mark Goldblatt and Dody Dorn.

His son, Aidan Barton, appeared in Star Wars: Episode III – Revenge of the Sith as baby Luke Skywalker and baby Princess Leia.

Filmography

References

External links
 

American film editors
Living people
1965 births